Belarus–China relations refers to the bilateral relations between Belarus and the People's Republic of China. Relations have been generally positive, with Belarusian President Alexander Lukashenko advocating that Belarus should take an approach of "understanding China, learning from China, and approaching China."

History 
Belarus became an independent country following the dissolution of the Soviet Union.

Lukashenko was elected President of Belarus on July 20, 1994, and has been re-elected since. Since early in his presidency, Lukashenko has advocated that Belarus should adopt an approach of "understanding China, learning from China, and approaching China."

In 2014, construction of the China–Belarus Industrial Park began.

In July 2015, Belarus became an observer in the Shanghai Cooperation Organisation, a multi-lateral security cooperation group which China played a lead role in founding.

At the 2022 China-Belarus summit, the countries agreed to form an "all-weather" partnership. The 2023 summit produced a range of cooperation documents on industry, trade, agricultural, and other matters.

Areas of cooperation 
Belarus cooperates with China's Belt and Road Initiative. In 2011, the two countries agreed to construct an industrial park in Belarus. After Chinese President Xi Jinping's announcement of the Belt and Road Initiative in 2013, Belarus responded positively and sought to combine the benefits of the Chinese initiative with its own national integration and public docking priorities. Under the auspices of the Belt and Road Initiative, construction on the China-Belarus Industrial Park began in 2014. It is now the largest industrial park built pursuant to the Belt and Road Initiative and serves as a major channel for Chinese goods to enter Europe.

Trade relations between the two countries have grown in recent years. In particular, Belarus markets agricultural and food products to China, where they have significant popularity.

Belarus was one of 53 countries that in June 2020 supported China's Hong Kong national security law at the United Nations Human Rights Council.

High level diplomatic exchanges 
Lukashenko visited China several times over the period 1995 to 2019, seeking to develop diplomatic and economic ties with China. He traveled to Beijing during the 2023 Belarus-China Summit. During the summit, the countries agreed to create a free trade zone in Belarus in 2023. On March 1, 2023, Lukashenko and Xi jointly called for the "soonest possible" peace deal in the 2022 Russian Invasion of Ukraine, stating their "deep concern about the development of the armed conflict in the European region and extreme interest in the soonest possible establishment of peace in Ukraine[.]"

See also
Foreign relations of Belarus
Foreign relations of China

References 

 
Foreign relations of China
Foreign relations of Belarus